Shamim Ara Panhwar is a Pakistani politician who has been a member of the National Assembly of Pakistan since August 2018. She has an MA International Relations from Sindh University, Jamshoro.

Political career
She was elected to the National Assembly of Pakistan as a candidate of Pakistan Peoples Party (PPP) on a reserved seat for women from Sindh in 2018 Pakistani general election.

References

Living people
Pakistan People's Party MNAs
Women members of the National Assembly of Pakistan
Pakistani MNAs 2018–2023
Year of birth missing (living people)
University of Sindh alumni
21st-century Pakistani women politicians